Incilius porteri is a species of toads in the family Bufonidae. It is endemic to the Montañas de Comayagua region, Honduras. Its natural habitat is tropical moist montane forests. It is likely threatened by habitat loss and chytridiomycosis.

References

amphibians described in 2005
amphibians of Honduras
endemic fauna of Honduras
porteri
taxonomy articles created by Polbot